Betty Boop and Little Jimmy is a 1936 Fleischer Studio animated short film, starring Betty Boop and featuring newspaper comic strip character Little Jimmy.

Plot

Betty Boop and Little Jimmy are working out in an attic equipped with 1930s vintage exercise equipment. Betty sings the song "Keep Your Girlish Figure" and Little Jimmy responds with a verse "If you're thin, don't worry over that. Just begin to laugh and you'll grow fat".

Betty starts using a belt exercise machine, but gets into trouble when its control gets stuck. She sends Little Jimmy to get an electrician, but along the way he gets distracted and the object of his search keeps changing – magician, politician, musician etc.  Finally, he comes across an old spring mattress.  He pulls out the springs, placing them on his feet, and goes bouncing all through the neighborhood, breaking through a market canopy, bouncing higher, back to Betty's house and up to the attic window.  Flying through, his foot disconnects the plug to the exercise machine. By now, Betty is pencil thin (her figure thinner than Olive Oyl's), and she looks so funny with the huge head and spindly body that she and Little Jimmy along with the furniture and scale laugh non-stop to the extent that both Betty and Jimmy blow up to be as round as balloons.

References

External links
 Betty Boop and Little Jimmy on YouTube.
 Betty Boop and Little Jimmy at The Big Cartoon Database.
 Betty Boop and Little Jimmy at IMDb.

1936 short films
Betty Boop cartoons
Animated films based on comics
Animated crossover films
1930s American animated films
American black-and-white films
1936 animated films
Paramount Pictures short films
Fleischer Studios short films
Short films directed by Dave Fleischer
1936 comedy films
American comedy short films
1930s English-language films
American animated short films
American crossover films
Animated films about children